African American Lives is a PBS television miniseries hosted by historian Henry Louis Gates Jr., focusing on African American genealogical research. The family histories of prominent people of African American descent are explored using traditional genealogic techniques as well as genetic analysis.

African American Lives
The first installment of the series aired in February 2006. The series featured research into the ancestral lineages of eight prominent African American guests. By billing the guests were: music producer Quincy Jones, astronaut and physician Mae Jemison, comedian Chris Tucker, bishop T. D. Jakes, sociologist Sara Lawrence-Lightfoot, actress Whoopi Goldberg, physician Ben Carson and talk show host Oprah Winfrey. Writer, host and executive producer of the series, Henry Louis Gates, also features his ancestral heritage on the show. The miniseries featured interviews with the parents and family members of guests including Winfrey's father, Vernon Winfrey. Geneticists Rick Kittles and Mark D. Shriver also make appearances.

The miniseries' four episodes were broadcast over two nights in two parts. On February 1, the first two episodes were broadcast as "Listening to our Past; The Promise of Freedom". The following week, on February 8, the third and fourth episodes aired as, "Searching for Our Names; Beyond the Middle Passage". Re-runs of the series as individual episodes were broadcast following the joint premier both nights. The miniseries was sponsored by Coca-Cola and Procter & Gamble who both produced commercials honoring African American heritage for use in the series.

African American Lives 2
African American Lives 2 premiered in February 2008, again hosted by Gates.  This second set of episodes traced the ancestry of performers Morgan Freeman, Tina Turner, Tom Joyner, Chris Rock, Don Cheadle, theologian Peter Gomes, athlete Jackie Joyner-Kersee, poet Maya Angelou, Bliss Broyard (the daughter of writer Anatole Broyard) and publisher Linda Johnson Rice (the daughter of publisher John H. Johnson).

In addition to these more publicly known guests, Kathleen Henderson, an administrator at the University of Dayton, was selected from more than 2,000 applicants to have her family history researched and to have DNA testing. The show continued the genealogical research into Gates's own ancestry. He learned, to his surprise, that it is at least 50% European, including at least one male ancestor who fought in the American Revolution.  Gates was invited to give a speech when he was later inducted into the Sons of the American Revolution. The four episodes of this miniseries are "The Road Home", "A Way Out of No Way", "We Come From People" and "The Past Is Another Country".

Episodes

Series overview

African American Lives (2006)

Oprah's Roots: An African American Lives Special (2007)
{{Episode table |background=#9C9C00 |overall= |season= |title= |airdate= |episodes= 
{{Episode list
 |EpisodeNumber   = 5
 |EpisodeNumber2  = 1
 |Title           = Oprah's Roots
 |OriginalAirDate = 
 |ShortSummary    = A special episode consisting entirely of footage from Oprah Winfrey's original interview for African American Lives''' first series.

 |LineColor       = 9C9C00
}}
}}

African American Lives 2 (2008)

Criticism
Due in part to a centuries-long history within the United States, historical experiences pre- and post-slavery, and migrations throughout North America, the majority of contemporary African Americans possess varying degrees of admixture with European ancestry.

Many historians and critics believe that a majority of African Americans also have some Native American ancestry but, according to the experts on this show, it may be much less frequent.

With the help of Mark D. Shriver, Henry Louis Gates, Jr. put African-American ancestry in these terms: 
58 percent of African Americans have at least 12.5 percent European ancestry (equivalent of one great-grandparent);
19.6 percent of African Americans have at least 25 percent European ancestry (equivalent of one grandparent);
1 percent of African Americans have at least 50 percent European ancestry (equivalent of one parent); and 
5 percent of African Americans have at least 12.5 percent Native American ancestry (equivalent to one great-grandparent).

However, critics suggest that the program failed to fully acknowledge to the audience, or inform guests, that not all ancestry may show up in such tests.  Full survey DNA testing cannot accurately determine an individual's full ancestry.

In more recent genetic testing research reported in 2015, scholars found that varied ancestries among African Americans related to different by region and sex of ancestors. These studies found that on average, African Americans have 73.2-82.1% West African, 16.7%-29% European, and 0.8–2% Native American genetic ancestry, with large variation among individuals.Henry Louis Gates, Jr., "Exactly How ‘Black’ Is Black America?", The Root, February 11, 2013.

The genetic tests done on direct paternal or maternal line evaluate only a few ancestors among many. Ancestral information markers (AIM) must also be done to form a more complete picture of a person's ancestry. For instance, MtDNA testing is only of direct maternal ancestors. AIM markers are not as clearly defined for all populations as suggested, and depend on data still being accumulated. Historic populations migrated, which also influences results.  Particularly, geneticists note that genetic analysis is incomplete related to Native Americans, and new genetic markers for these populations may be identified.

In other media

Gates has written an associated book, In Search of Our Roots: How 19 Extraordinary African Americans Reclaimed Their Past, which was published in early 2009.

See also
 Faces of America Finding Your Roots Ancestors in the Attic Who Do You Think You Are?References

External links
 Series 1 at PBS.org
 Series 2 at PBS.org
 
 
 Afrocentrifugal Force: Looking Blackward With Henry Louis Gates Jr., Village Voice, Joy Press, January 24, 2006
 Lloyd, Robert. "The roots of black America - Maya Angelou and Don Cheadle are among the personages who trace their lineage this time around", Los Angeles Times, February 6, 2008 (second series review)
  Hochschild, Adam. "35 Million Ways to Be Black", Mother Jones, March 14, 2007
 
 "African American Lives 2|PBS". YouTube.
 Ron Nixon, "DNA Tests Find Branches but Few Roots", The New York Times, November 25, 2007.
 Henry Louis Gates, Jr. "Dispatches From the Editor in Chief", Oxford African American Studies Center.
 Felicia R. Lee, "Famous Black Lives Through DNA's Prism", The New York Times'', February 5, 2008.
 https://web.archive.org/web/20080924184431/http://www.blackamericaweb.com/site.aspx/bawnews/africanamericanlives2206
 NPR interview with Henry Louis Gates

African-American genealogy
2000s American documentary television series
2006 American television series debuts
2008 American television series endings
African–Native American relations
PBS original programming
Television series about family history